Aldie Castle is an historic building east of Crook of Devon, Perth and Kinross, Scotland. It is a Category A listed building. This three storey tower house dates to the early 16th century. A two-storey extension was made and a separate parallel three storey range was built and a link range between. It has a concealed vaulted basement.

The castle was the former seat of the Mercers, who acquired it from the Murrays of Tullibardine around 1350. It later passed to the Nairn family and then through marriage to the Lansdowne family. It was restored in the 1950s.

See also
List of Category A listed buildings in Perth and Kinross

References

Category A listed buildings in Perth and Kinross
1765 establishments in Scotland
Castles in Perth and Kinross
Houses in Perth and Kinross
Listed castles in Scotland